Kirkcudbright was a royal burgh that returned one commissioner to the Parliament of Scotland and to the Convention of Estates.

After the Acts of Union 1707, the commissioner for Kirkcudbright was one of the Scottish representatives to the first Parliament of Great Britain. From 1708 Kirkcudbright, Annan, Dumfries, Lochmaben and Sanquhar formed the Dumfries district of burghs, returning one member between them to the House of Commons of Great Britain.

List of burgh commissioners

 1661: John Ewart, provost
 1665 convention, 1667 convention, 1669–74: John Glendening, provost 
 1678 convention: William Ewart, provost  
 1681–82: Samuel Cairmunt 
 1685–86: Hendry Muir, bailie (died c.1685)
 1686: John Callender, merchant-burgess 
 1689 convention, 1689–95: John Ewart, former provost (excused on grounds of age and infirmity, died c.1698) 
 1700–1702, 1702–07: Andrew Hume

See also
 List of constituencies in the Parliament of Scotland at the time of the Union

References

Burghs represented in the Parliament of Scotland (to 1707)
Constituencies disestablished in 1707
1707 disestablishments in Scotland
Politics of Dumfries and Galloway
History of Dumfries and Galloway
Kirkcudbright